Dieumerci! is a 2016 French comedy directed by Lucien Jean-Baptiste.

Cast

 Lucien Jean-Baptiste as Dieumerci
 Baptiste Lecaplain as Clément
 Delphine Théodore as Brigitte
 Olivier Sitruk as Marc
 Firmine Richard as Marie-Thérèse
 Michel Jonasz as Daniel
 Jean-François Balmer as Ventura
 Edouard Montoute as The Chief
 Jacques Frantz as Polito
 Noémie Merlant as Audrey
 Sabine Pakora as The prostitute
 Alexis Tomassian as Red cap Prisoner

References

External links
 

2016 films
2016 comedy films
French comedy films
2010s French-language films
Films set in France
2010s French films